Tritheledontidae, the tritheledontids or ictidosaurs, is an extinct family of small to medium-sized (about 10 to 20 cm long) cynodonts. They were highly mammal-like, specialized cynodonts, although they still retained a few reptile-like anatomical traits. Tritheledontids were mainly carnivorous or insectivorous, though some species may have developed omnivory. Their skeletons show that they had a close relationship to mammals. Tritheledontids or their closest relatives may have given rise to the mammaliaforms. The tritheledontids were one of the longest lived non-mammalian therapsid lineages, living from the late Triassic to the Jurassic period. Tritheledontids became extinct in the Jurassic period, possibly due to competition with prehistoric mammals such as the eutriconodonts. They are known from finds in South America and South Africa, indicating that they may have lived only on the supercontinent of Gondwana. The family Tritheledontidae was named by South African paleontologist Robert Broom in 1912. The family is often misspelled "Trithelodontidae".

It is possible that tritheledontids had vibrissae, according to the PBS documentary, Your Inner Fish.  A common ancestor of all therian mammals did so.  It is possible that the development of the whisker sensory system played an important role in mammalian development, more generally.

Genera
 Chaliminia
 Diarthrognathus
 Elliotherium
 Irajatherium
 Pachygenelus
 Riograndia
 Tritheledon

See also
 Evolution of mammals

References

External links
 PBS YouTube animated video of a tritheledontid

 
Late Triassic first appearances
Middle Jurassic extinctions
Prehistoric therapsid families